Irish red ale, also known as red ale or Irish ale, is a style of pale ale that is brewed using a moderate amount of kilned malts and roasted barley, giving the beer its red colour. Its strength typically ranges from 3.8% to 4.8% alcohol by volume, although some craft varieties can be as high as 6%.

In the United States, "Irish red" is sometimes used describe a darker amber ale or a "red" beer that is a lager with caramel colouring. However, these beers are not Irish red ales.

History
Irish red ale originated in the city of Kilkenny in the early 1700s. Although ale had been brewed in the city at St. Francis Abbey since the 14th century, the origins of Irish red ale date to a brewery established by Daniel Sullivan in 1702. A merchant class of predominantly Catholic families were involved in brewing, distilling, malting and milling in the city in the 18th century, namely Archdeakin, Brennan, Cormick, Connell, Dullard, Hyland, Kinchella, McCreary, Meighan, Smithwick, Sullivan and Watters. Conditions for brewing and distilling in Kilkenny were ideal, and by 1782 there were eight distilleries in the city. Due to County Kilkenny's favourable climate, the city's agricultural hinterland provided abundant yields of corn, wheat and barley. Further, as noted by MP and brewer Richard Sullivan in 1834, the nearby Castlecomer Plateau provided brewers and distillers in the city with a plentiful supply of coal.

The genre-defining Irish red ale is Smithwick's, which traces its lineage to 1710, with the establishment of John Smithwick's brewery at St. Francis Abbey. However, the venture was short-lived and the brewery was sold by the family. This was commonplace in Kilkenny at the time, as periods of political instability and sporadic famine in Ireland in the 18th and 19th centuries weighed heavily on the industry. John's grandson, Edmond Smithwick, re-acquired the St. Francis Abbey brewery in 1827 from the Brennans and greatly expanded its operations. By 1918 the Sullivan family had grown deeply indebted and were forced to sell their brewery, leaving Smithwick's as the dominant force in the market.

This style of ale was available only in Ireland until the 1960s, when Smithwick's began actively pursuing foreign markets. The company was acquired by Guinness in 1965 and the brand was relaunched, alongside other now discontinued beers brewed by Smithwick's, such as 'Time ale' and 'Time barley wine'. In 1987, Guinness developed an export-only brand of Smithwick's known as Kilkenny, which has since evolved into its own distinct variant, with a redder colour, more bitter taste and foamier head.

While "Irish ale" had been brewed for centuries, the term "Irish red ale" was rarely, if ever, used in Ireland. It was popularised in the United States to describe a style of reddish-amber ale that has its roots in Ireland. In 1981, Coors licensed Killian's Irish Red from Heineken France, which became one of the top selling specialty beer brands in the United States. Killian's Irish Red, which is actually an amber lager, popularised the name "Irish red ale" to such an extent that the term was imported back into Ireland by many craft brewers as a classification.

In 2013, the Smithwick's brewery in Kilkenny was finally closed and all brewing moved to St. James's Gate in Dublin. In order to keep the tradition of Kilkenny brewing alive, descendants of both the Smithwick and Sullivan families opened a new brewery in Kilkenny and relaunched the Sullivan's brand in 2016.

Style
The colour of Irish red ale is in the 11 to 18 range as defined by the Standard Reference Method (SRM). The style of beer is characterised by its malt profile, which typically includes a caramel or toffee-like sweetness. Irish red ales have a dry finish and a low to moderate bitterness of 15-30 IBU. Due to its sweet taste and relatively low alcohol content, Irish red ales are very popular with American craft brewers. Kilkenny and Smithwick's are by far the most common macro-brewed varieties.

By region

Ireland

Carlow
O'Hara's Irish Red

Cork
Franciscan Well Rebel Red
Murphy's Irish Red
8 Degrees Irish Red

Kilkenny
Costello's
Kilkenny
Sullivan's
Smithwick's

Derry
Heaney's Red Ale
Heaney's Modern Red

Dublin
Porterhouse Red
Rascal's Big Hop Red
J.W. Sweetman Irish Red Ale
Dublin Red

Galway
Blood Red Ale
Bay Ale Red

Kildare
Rye River Red Ale

Limerick
Thomond Red Ale
Bill's Red Ale

Sligo
Lough Gill Anderson's Red Ale

Tipperary
White Gypsy Ruby Red

Waterford
Copper Coast Red Ale

Wexford
Yellowbelly Red Noir Dark Ale

Wicklow
Wicklow Wolf Amber

United States

California
Red Trolley Ale

Indiana
Brian Boru

Maryland
Lucky SOB Red Ale

Massachusetts
Samuel Adams Irish Red

Ohio
Conway's Irish Ale

See also
Beer in Ireland
Irish stout

References

Notes

1700s in Ireland
Beer in Ireland
Irish alcoholic drinks
Food and drink in Ireland
Irish brands
Beer styles